Majendie is a surname and may refer to:

Henry Majendie (1754–1830), English bishop
James Majendie (1871–1939), British politician
John James Majendie (1709–1783), Canon of Windsor, 1774-83
Lewis Majendie (1835–1885), British politician
Musette Majendie (1903–1981), owner of Hedingham Castle
Nick Majendie (born 1942), English cricketer 
Vivian Dering Majendie (1836–1898), English bomb disposal expert
Vivian Majendie (1886–1960), English cricketer and general